Fiskebøl is a village in Hadsel Municipality in Nordland county, Norway.  The village is located on the island of Austvågøya on the southern shore of the Hadselfjorden.  It has a ferry quay for the Melbu–Fiskebøl Ferry.  The village is located just west of the Sloverfjord Tunnel where the European route E10 crosses the Sloverfjorden.

References

Hadsel
Villages in Nordland